This is a list of transfers involving German football clubs during the 2020 summer transfer window. Only transfers of the Bundesliga and 2. Bundesliga are included.

Due to the COVID-19 pandemic in Germany and the resulting impact on the scheduling of the 2019–20 and 2020–21 seasons, the German Football Association modified the dates for the summer transfer window. To allow for the registration of players based on previously signed contracts, the window opened on 1 July 2020 for a single day. The transfer window then re-opened on 15 July and closed on 5 October 2020.

Bundesliga

Note: Flags indicate national team as has been defined under FIFA eligibility rules. Players may hold more than one non-FIFA nationality.

Bayern Munich

In:

Out:

Borussia Dortmund

In:

Out:

RB Leipzig

In:

Out:

Borussia Mönchengladbach

In:

Out:

Bayer Leverkusen

In:

Out:

1899 Hoffenheim

In:

Out:

VfL Wolfsburg

In:

Out:

SC Freiburg

In:

Out:

Eintracht Frankfurt

In:

Out:

Hertha BSC

In:

Out:

Union Berlin

In:

Out:

Schalke 04

In:

Out:

Mainz 05

In:

Out:

1. FC Köln

In:

Out:

FC Augsburg

In:

Out:

Werder Bremen

In:

Out:

Arminia Bielefeld

In:

Out:

VfB Stuttgart

In:

Out:

2. Bundesliga

Fortuna Düsseldorf

In:

Out:

SC Paderborn

In:

Out:

1. FC Heidenheim

In:

Out:

Hamburger SV

In:

Out:

Darmstadt 98

In:

Out:

Hannover 96

In:

Out:

Erzgebirge Aue

In:

Out:

VfL Bochum

In:

Out:

Greuther Fürth

In:

Out:

SV Sandhausen

In:

Out:

Holstein Kiel

In:

Out:

Jahn Regensburg

In:

Out:

VfL Osnabrück

In:

Out:

FC St. Pauli

In:

Out:

Karlsruher SC

In:

Out:

1. FC Nürnberg

In:

Out:

Würzburger Kickers

In:

Out:

Eintracht Braunschweig

In:

Out:

See also

 2020–21 Bundesliga
 2020–21 2. Bundesliga

References

External links
 Official site of the DFB 
 Kicker.de 
 Official site of the Bundesliga 
 Official site of the Bundesliga

Football transfers summer 2020
Trans
2020